is a passenger railway station  located in the city of   Amagasaki Hyōgo Prefecture, Japan. It is operated by the private transportation company Hanshin Electric Railway.

Lines

Layout
The station consists of two elevated island platforms and one elevated unnumbered side platform serving four tracks. Normally only the island platforms are used, and the side platform is used as a temporary drop-off platform during the Amagasaki boat race .

Platforms

History 
Amagasaki Center Pool-mae Station Station opened on September 14, 1952 as a temporary station on the Hanshin Main Line.

It was upgraded to an elevated station in January 1994.

Station numbering was introduced on 1 April 2014, with Amagasaki Center Pool-mae Station being designated as station number HS-11.

Gallery

Passenger statistics
In fiscal 2019, the station was used by an average of 10,721 passengers daily

Surrounding area
 Amagasaki Boat Race Stadium

See also
List of railway stations in Japan

References

External links

  Amagasaki Center Pool-mae Station website 

Railway stations in Japan opened in 1952
Railway stations in Hyōgo Prefecture
Hanshin Main Line
Amagasaki